"Sex Bomb" is a song by Welsh singer Tom Jones. Performed in collaboration with German DJ and record producer Mousse T., the song was released in 1999 in several European countries; in January of the following year, it was issued across the rest of Europe except the United Kingdom, where it was not released until May 2000. Outside the UK, the track served as the second single from Jones' 34th album, Reload, while in the UK, it served as the fourth single.

Commercially, "Sex Bomb" reached number one in France and Switzerland while becoming a top-three hit in Austria, Germany, Iceland, Italy, Spain, the United Kingdom, and Wallonia. The Peppermint Disco Mix of the track contains a sample from "All American Girls" by Sister Sledge and has been used as the opening theme song of the WB Network television series Grosse Pointe. A different version appears on Mousse T.'s 2001 debut solo album, Gourmet de Funk.

Track listings

 UK CD1 and cassette single
 "Sex Bomb" (Peppermint Disco radio mix)
 "Sex Bomb" (Sounds of Life half vocal mix)
 "Sex Bomb" (Strike Boys mix)
 "Sex Bomb" (album version)

 UK CD2
 "Sex Bomb" (Peppermint Disco radio mix)
 "Sex Bomb" (Agent Sumo's freestyle mix)
 "Sex Bomb" (Peppermint Disco dub mix)
 "Sex Bomb" (video)

 UK 12-inch single
A1. "Sex Bomb" (Peppermint Disco mix) – 6:25
A2. "Sex Bomb" (Peppermint Disco dub mix) – 6:46
B1. "Sex Bomb" (Sounds of Life half vocal mix) – 6:36

 European CD single
 "Sex Bomb" (Peppermint Disco radio mix)
 "Sex Bomb" (album version)

 European maxi-CD single
 "Sex Bomb" (album version)
 "Sex Bomb" (Peppermint Disco radio mix)
 "Sex Bomb" (Peppermint Disco mix)
 "Sex Bomb" (Strike Boys mix)
 "Sex Bomb" (Sounds of Life half vocal mix)

 Australian CD single
 "Sex Bomb" (album version)
 "Sex Bomb" (Peppermint Disco radio mix)
 "Sex Bomb" (Peppermint Disco mix)
 "Sex Bomb" (Sounds of Life half vocal mix)
 "Sex Bomb" (Sounds of Life bub mix)
 "Sex Bomb" (Mousse T's big beat)
 "Sex Bomb" (Strike Boys mix)

Credits and personnel
Credits are adapted from the Reload booklet.

Studios
 Recorded at Peppermint Park Studios (Germany) and Bunk, Junk, and Genius Recording Studios (London, England)
 Mastered at The Soundmasters (London, England)

Personnel

 Mousse T. – writing, composition, production
 Errol Rennalls – writing, composition
 Tom Jones – vocals
 Lutz Krajenski – Hammond organ
 Peter Hinderthür – horns, bass
 Uwe Granitza – horns
 Kevin Metcalf – mastering

Charts and certifications

Weekly charts

Year-end charts

Certifications

Release history

References

1999 songs
2000 singles
European Hot 100 Singles number-one singles
Number-one singles in Switzerland
SNEP Top Singles number-one singles
Tom Jones (singer) songs
V2 Records singles